Vishnyovka is a rural locality (a village) in Kosh-Yelginsky Selsoviet, Bizhbulyaksky District, Bashkortostan, Russia. The population was 18 as of 2010. There is 1 street.

Geography 
Vishnevka is located 51 km north of Bizhbulyak (the district's administrative centre) by road. Sosnovka is the nearest rural locality.

References 

Rural localities in Bizhbulyaksky District